Franklin Township is a township in Linn County, Iowa.

History
Franklin Township was organized in 1841.

References

'

Townships in Linn County, Iowa
Townships in Iowa
1841 establishments in Iowa Territory